Malarina is a genus of Australian sheetweb spiders that was first described by V. T. Davies & C. L. Lambkin in 2000.<ref name=Davi2000>{{cite journal| last1=Davies| first1=V. T.| last2=Lambkin| first2=C. L.| year=2000| title=Malarina, a new spider genus (Araneae: Amaurobioidea: Kababinae) from the wet tropics of Queensland, Australia| journal=Memoirs of the Queensland Museum| pages=273–283| volume=45}}</ref>

Species
 it contains four species, found in Queensland:Malarina cardwell Davies & Lambkin, 2000 – Australia (Queensland)Malarina collina Davies & Lambkin, 2000 – Australia (Queensland)Malarina masseyensis Davies & Lambkin, 2000 – Australia (Queensland)Malarina monteithi'' Davies & Lambkin, 2000 – Australia (Queensland)

See also
 List of Stiphidiidae species

References

Araneomorphae genera
Spiders of Australia
Stiphidiidae
Taxa named by Valerie Todd Davies